The 2018 World University Cycling Championship was the 8th edition of the World University Cycling Championship. The tournament was hosted by the Portuguese Academic University Sports Federation (FADU), sponsored by the International University Sports Federation (FISU) and sanctioned by the Union Cycliste Internationale (UCI).

References

Cycling
World University Cycling Championships
Sport in Braga
International cycle races hosted by Portugal
World University Cycling Championships
World University